Mariche is the name of a former native Venezuelan tribe.

Not much information from them as a tribe has survived to the present day. It is known that their descendants lived in what is now called Filas de Mariches, distrito Sucre, Estado Miranda and in the area of El Hatillo both near Caracas, Venezuela, where they lived very close to several Karina (Carib) tribes.

Reports by some scholars claim that Mariche natives inhabited a site called Guayana long before the discovery of South America by the Spaniards.

One of their more celebrated chiefs was Tamanaco who led them in the fight against the Spanish conquistadors during the 1560s and 1570s.

Indigenous peoples in Venezuela